Ali Reza Panahian (also Ali-Reza Panahian; ; born 1965 Tehran) is an Iranian Twelver Shia Scholar and official. He is a Hojatoleslam (a "middle-ranked" Shia cleric) and head of Iranian Supreme Leader Ali Khamenei's "think tank for universities." In February 2011 he was among some "70 high-ranking" officials of the Islamic Republic who established an "`Ammar` organization" or "Ammar Headquarters" calling for the "trial and execution" of former presidential candidates and Iranian Green Movement protest leaders Mir-Hossein Mousavi and Mehdi Karroubi. Raja News has listed him as one of 40-odd "students, confidants and political companions" close to most ideological leader Ayatollah Mohammad-Taqi Mesbah-Yazdi.

Panahian also addressed the 2010 "Islamic Unity Seminar" in Lahore, Pakistan on the subjects of the Prophet Muhammad's "character and Islamic Unity."

Views
In July 2010 he issued a statement "calling for the purge of `liberal-minded and clean-shaven` individuals from government offices" and warned against an unnamed "group that 'will wage a war on values under the cover of Islamic slogans and symbols'".

He believes that religiosity must be accompanied by inner passion and happiness.

He also lectures extensively on apocalypse and Mahdism family and raising children, and publishing Shiism.

See also 
 Ali Akbar Raefipour
 Hassan Rahimpour Azghadi
 Mohsin Qara'ati
 Hassan Abbasi
 Seyyed Abdollah Fateminia

References

External Links 

 Alireza Panahian in YouTube
 Alireza Panahian in Twitter

Popular Front of Islamic Revolution Forces politicians
Iranian Shia clerics
Living people
Shia Islamists
1965 births
People from Tehran